L. limosa may refer to:
 Legenere limosa, an annual wildflower species endemic to limited portions of Northern California
 Limosa limosa, the black-tailed godwit, a shorebird species found from Iceland through Europe and areas of central Asia

See also 
 Limosa (disambiguation)